Lyndon Nigel Burgess (born 17 November 1981) is a Bermudian sportsman. Best known for his football career as goalkeeper, playing for the Bermuda national team, he was also capped by the Bermuda national rugby union team.

Football career
Burgess attended Howard University in the United States, where he studied for a master's degree in electrical engineering and played for the Howard Bison in the NCAA tournament. He then returned to Bermuda and played for Hamilton Parish, and played for the team for three years in the Bermudian Premier Division. In 2007 he was signed by USL Second Division club Bermuda Hogges.

He later returned to Hamilton Parish, and became club secretary, a role previously held by his father.

Rugby career
Burgess also played rugby union for the Bermuda Police club, playing as a left wing.
In 2015 he was called up to play for the Bermuda rugby union team, winning his first cap against Turks & Caicos.

References

1981 births
Living people
Howard Bison men's soccer players
Bermuda Hogges F.C. players
USL Second Division players
Association football goalkeepers
Bermuda international footballers
Bermudian rugby union players
Bermudian footballers
Footballers who switched code